The following is list of libraries in Mexico.

Libraries in Mexico 
 Biblioteca Benjamín Franklin
 Biblioteca Central (UNAM)
 
 
 
 
 
 
 
 Biblioteca Palafoxiana
 
 Biblioteca Vasconcelos
 Cervantine Library
 
 Francisco Xavier Clavigero Library
 
 Library of the Congress of Mexico
 Museum of the City of Mexico's Jaime Torres Bodet Library
 National Library of Mexico
 Vicente Fox Center of Studies, Library and Museum

See also 

 Public libraries in North America, including Mexico 
 , Mexico City
 Asociación Mexicana de Bibliotecarios
 List of archives in Mexico
 List of museums in Mexico

References

This article incorporates information from the Spanish Wikipedia.

Further reading

 
 

 
Mexico
Libraries
Libraries